Haukur Jón Gunnarsson (born 5 July 1949) is an Icelandic theatre instructor and director.

He is best known for his work in Norway, where he was the director of Beaivváš Sámi Theatre from 1991 to 1996, Hålogaland Teater from 1997 to 2000 and Beaivváš Sámi Theatre again from 2007. He is also known for spreading Japanese theater, including Kabuki, in Norway, and has been awarded for this by the UNESCO.

References

1949 births
Living people
Haukur J. Gunnarsson
Haukur J. Gunnarsson